Andrea del Minga or Andrea di Mariotto del Minga (1540–1596) was a Florentine painter of the Mannerist style.  He was employed in Giorgio Vasari's team that decorated of the Studiolo of Francesco I in the Palazzo Vecchio.

References

1540 births
1596 deaths
Mannerist painters
16th-century Italian painters
Italian male painters
Painters from Florence